Vaughn is a census-designated place and unincorporated community in Pierce County, Washington, United States. Vaughn is located on Vaughn Bay in the northwestern Key Peninsula. Vaughn has a post office with ZIP code 98394.

Vaughn was named for W.D. Vaughn, who settled in the area around 1851.

Vaughn was once an important port for the Key Peninsula.  From the 1870s to the 1920s, transportation needs for Vaughn and other communities along Case Inlet were once served by a small flotilla of steamboats.
The local community based monthly newspaper called the North Bay Review, services Allyn.

Climate
This region experiences warm (but not hot) and dry summers, with no average monthly temperatures above 71.6 °F.  According to the Köppen Climate Classification system, Vaughn has a warm-summer Mediterranean climate, abbreviated "Csb" on climate maps.

References

Census-designated places in Pierce County, Washington
Census-designated places in Washington (state)
Unincorporated communities in Pierce County, Washington
Unincorporated communities in Washington (state)